Marcantonio Stiffi (born 26 January 1967) is an Italian bobsledder. He competed at the 1992 Winter Olympics and the 1994 Winter Olympics.

References

External links
 

1967 births
Living people
Italian male bobsledders
Olympic bobsledders of Italy
Bobsledders at the 1992 Winter Olympics
Bobsledders at the 1994 Winter Olympics
Sportspeople from Lecco